Government Medical College, Ernakulam (previously Cochin Medical College) is one of the medical colleges in the state of Kerala situated at Kalamassery, Kochi. It was a government-owned institution established by the Co-operative Academy of Professional Education under the Department of Co-operation, Govt. of Kerala, established in the year 1999. The college has an intake capacity of 110 students (100 students till 2019) for the MBBS course each year. It was taken over by the Government of Kerala as a pure government institution on 11 December 2013. There are Post graduate courses in three clinical (Medicine, Pediatrics and Psychiatry) and two  paraclinical departments (Pathology and Microbiology). It also includes the college of nursing, Biomedical engineering courses and Operation Theatre courses functioning in the college campus. Campus has a Well functioning cafeteria Gymnasium, Library, Football stadium,  Basketball court, Volleyball Court and Indoor badminton courts. 60% works of an associated new Superspeciality Block is also completed.

History 
The college initially functioned at General Hospital, Ernakulam, and Indira Gandhi Cooperative Hospital, Kochi and classes were conducted at Jawaharlal Nehru International Stadium complex, Kochi. Land was acquired at HMT Estate at Kalamassery and the foundation stone for the campus was laid by Shri E.K. Nayanar, the then Chief Minister of Kerala State. The college was shifted to the present campus at Kalamassery in 2004 and was inaugurated by Shri A.K. Antony, Chief Minister of Kerala. Dr P.G.R. Pillai was the founding principal of the college.

The College 
The college spreads around 60 acres of at Kalamassery in the outskirts of the city. The complex includes 700-bedded Medical College hospital, College of Nursing and the Cochin Cancer Research Centre. The campus also counts with furnished hostels for students, resident quarters and staff quarters.

Cochin Cancer Research Centre 
Due to the alarming increase of cancer patient in the state, the Government of Kerala decided to setup cancer research centre in the central part of the state. The foundation stone for the centre was laid on August 18, 2014.

Departments

Preclinical
 Anatomy
 Physiology
 Biochemistry

Paraclinical
 Pathology
 Pharmacology
 Microbiology
 Forensic Medicine
 Community Medicine

Clinical Specialities
 General Medicine
 General Surgery
 Obstetrics and Gynecology
 Pediatrics and Neonatology
 Otorhinolaryngology
 Ophthalmology
 Orthopedics
 Dermatology
 Psychiatry
 Dentistry
 Radio diagnostics
 Anaesthesiology
 Respiratory medicine

Super Specialities
 Cardiology
 Neurology
 Nephrology

Biomedical Engineering

Facilities
The Medical College Hospital complex consists 700-bedded Wards, 24 hour Casualty, Medical ICU, Surgical ICU, Paediatric ICU, Neonatal ICU, Major & Minor operation theatres. There is also a specialised Burns Unit for providing advanced care to Burns patients. The hospital provides investigation facilities including MRI, CT, USG and all sort of laboratory services.

The Medical college hospital is equipped with 24 hour fully functioning blood bank.

RT-PCR Lab 
A realtime Revese Transcriptase -Polymerase Chain Reaction (RT-PCR) lab was setup in the hospital during the beginning stage of COVID-19 pandemic. The lab started functioning after getting approval from ICMR in April 2020.

Cathlab

Achievements

Covid Care 
The hospital was turned to a COVID care centre in Ernakulam district exclusively for COVID -19 patients on last week of March 2020. The facilities and treatment given  in the hospital were praised internationally, after a UK citizen was discharged COVID negative.

Karmi Bot 
The robot named ‘KARMI-Bot’ is used to assist patients at the medical college's COVID-19 isolation ward.The robot developed by ASIMOV Robotics, was donated to medical college by famous actor Mohanlal. The robot has fully autonomous features for dispensing food & water, disinfection, collecting trash and other features like video call.

Events and activities

Revera 

The respective Students' Union of Government Medical College Ernakulam organises an inter-medical college sports event revera every year. It was started from 2018 (organised by SU2k18) onwards, which was a grand success with a lot of appreciations for the heavy participation, organisation and the good conduct.

Graduation 
Each year there will be separate graduation ceremonies of both MBBS and nursing graduates.

References

External links 

  Government Medical College, Ernakulam

Medical colleges in Kochi
Ernakulam
Educational institutions established in 1999
1999 establishments in Kerala